Rachid Ksentini (November 11, 1887 – August 4, 1944) was an Algerian actor and comedian.

Biography
Rachid Ksentini was born Rachid Belakhdar on November 11, 1887 in the Casbah of Algiers. He left school early to work as an apprentice carpenter with his father in Bab El Oued until 1914. On the eve of the First World War, he enlisted as a seaman in the merchant navy and left to France. The boat where he embarked was torpedoed by German naval forces. The survivors were rescued by the Royal Navy, which were then transferred to Marseille. by his profession of sailor, he traveled to Europe, North America, China, and India. He returned to Algeria but for a short stay before going back to France. in 1925, he made his return to his home country and meets the same year in a cafe, Ali Sellali a.k.a. Allalou who asked him to integrate his theatrical troupe Ezzahia. Their collaboration results among other things by the presentation of the play Zaouadj Bouaklin on October 26, 1926, which marks the first appearance of Ksentini on stage. A performance that captivated the public. The collaboration between the two men continues with an adaptations by Allalou of sequences from One Thousand and One Nights, where Rachid Ksentine obtained the first role. In 1927, he created with Djelloul Bachedjerrah, the El Djazaïr troupe disbanded shortly after.

Rachid Ksentini emerged mainly in theater. but at the same time invested himself in comedy songs with social background. Many of his songs are covers or interpolation composed from national heritage music tunes, for example with Ach men âr alikoum ya bnaïn ennas, drawn from Ach men âr Alikoum ya rdjal Meknes (a verse from a poem by Kaddour El Alamy).

A TV series dedicated to the actor was cast in 2005, directed by Boualem Aďssaoui from a screenplay by Rachid Soufi. The series consists of twelve parts of 30 minutes each.

Bibliography

Death
Rachid Ksentini died on August 4, 1944.

See also
Marie Soussan

References

External links

Rachid Ksentini at musicme.com
Songs on Deezer

1887 births
1944 deaths
Algerian male stage actors
People from Casbah
Algerian male comedians
20th-century Algerian male actors
French military personnel of World War I
20th-century Algerian male singers
20th-century comedians